Pleurotomella striarella is an extinct species of sea snail, a marine gastropod mollusk in the family Raphitomidae.

Description

Distribution
Fossils of this marine species were found in Eocene strata in Île-de-France, France

References

 Cossmann (M.) & Pissarro (G.), 1913 Iconographie complète des coquilles fossiles de l'Éocène des environs de Paris, t. 2, p. pl. 46-65
 Le Renard (J.) & Pacaud (J.-M.), 1995 Révision des Mollusques paléogènes du Bassin de Paris. 2 - Liste des références primaires des espèces. Cossmanniana, t. 3, vol. 3, p. 65-132

striarella
Gastropods described in 1804